Agriculture in Israel is a highly developed industry. Israel is a major exporter of fresh produce and a world-leader in agricultural technologies despite the fact that the geography of the country is not naturally conducive to agriculture. More than half of the land area is desert, and the climate and lack of water resources do not favor farming. Only 20% of the land area is naturally arable. In 2008 agriculture represented 2.5% of total GDP and 3.6% of exports. While farmworkers made up only 3.7% of the work force, Israel produced 95% of its own food requirements, supplementing this with imports of grain, oilseeds, meat, coffee, cocoa and sugar.

Israel is home to two unique types of agricultural communities, the kibbutz and moshav, which developed as Jews from all over the world made aliyah to the country and embarked on rural settlement. As of 2016, kibbutzim provided Israel with about 40% of its agricultural produce.

History

The development of modern agriculture was closely tied to the Zionist movement and Jewish immigration to Palestine in the late nineteenth century. Jews who immigrated purchased land that was mostly semi-arid, although much had been rendered untillable by deforestation, soil erosion and neglect. They set about clearing rocky fields, constructing terraces, draining swampland, reforesting, counteracting soil erosion, and washing salty land. Agricultural production has expanded 16 times, three times more than population growth.

Water shortage is a major problem. Most of Israel's freshwater sources have been consequently joined to the National Water Carrier, network of pumping stations, reservoirs, canals and pipelines that transfers water from the north to the south.

Today

The importance of agriculture in Israel's economy has fallen over time, accounting for decreasing values of GDP. In 1979, it accounted for just under 6% of GDP, 5.1% by 1985, and today, 2.5%. In 1995, there were 43,000 farm units with an average size of 13.5 hectares. 19.8% of these were smaller than 1 hectare, 75.7% were 1 to 9 hectares in size, 3.3% were between 10 and 49 hectares, 0.4% were between 50 and 190 hectares, and 0.8% were larger than 200 hectares. Of the 380,000 hectares under cultivation in 1995, 20.8% was under permanent cultivation and 79.2% under rotating cultivation. Farm units included 160,000 hectares used for activities other than cultivation. Cultivation was based mainly in the northern coastal plains, the hills of the interior, and the upper Jordan Valley.

In 2006, agricultural output fell by 0.6% following a 3.6% rise in 2005; inputs for 2007 rose by 1.2% excluding wages. Between 2004 and 2006, vegetables accounted for around 35% of total agricultural output. Flowers made up around 20%, field crops made up around 18%, fruits (other than citrus), around 15%, and citrus fruits around 10%. In 2006, 36.7% of agricultural output was for domestic consumption, 33.9% for domestic manufacturing, and 22% for direct export. In 2006, 33% of vegetables, 27% of flowers, 16% of field crops, 15.5% of fruits other than citrus, and 9% of citrus fruits were exported.

Israeli agricultural production rose 26% between 1999 and 2009, while the number of farmers dropped from 23,500 to 17,000. Farmers have also grown more with less water, using 12% less water to grow 26% more produce.

In 2022, Israel's Ministry of Agriculture and Rural Development announced a plan to increase the total number of agricultural lands cultivated, and to improve the labor force by supporting new farmers and farmers who have not worked in the field for at least seven years with a total of 10 million shekels.

Farm types

Most of Israel's agriculture is based on cooperative principles that evolved in the early twentieth century. Two unique forms of agricultural settlements; the kibbutz, a collective community in which the means of production are communally owned and each member's work benefits all; and the moshav, a farming village where each family maintains its own household and works its own land, while purchasing and marketing are conducted co-operatively. Both communities provided a means not only to realise the dream of the pioneers to have rural communities based on social equality, co-operation and mutual aid but also to gain agricultural output in a productive means. Today, between kibbutzim and moshavim, 76% of the country's fresh produce is output, as well as many processed food products.

Agricultural produce

Crops
Due to the diversity of the land and climate across the country, Israel is able to grow a wide range of crops. Field crops grown in the country include wheat, sorghum and corn. On 215,000 hectares of land, these sorts of crops are grown, 156,000 hectares of which are winter crops.

Fruit and vegetables grown include citrus, avocados, kiwifruit, guavas and mangoes, grapes from orchards located on the Mediterranean coastal plain. Tomatoes, cucumbers, peppers and zucchini are grown commonly throughout the country; melons are grown during winter months in the valleys. Subtropical areas in the country produce bananas and dates, while in the northern hills apples, pears and cherries are grown. Furthermore, grape vineyards are found across the country, as the country's wine industry has developed to become a world-player.

In 1997, $107 million worth of cotton was grown in Israel with most of this sold in advance on the futures market. The crop is grown on 28,570 hectares of land, all of which is drip irrigated. 5.5 tons per hectare of raw cotton is averaged for the Acala crop; the Pima crop averages 5 tons per hectare, which are yields among the highest in the world.

Livestock

Local cows produce the highest amounts of milk per animal in the world, with an average of 10,208 kilograms (around 10,000 liters) of dairy in 2009, according to data published in 2011 by the Israel Central Bureau of Statistics, outperforming cows in the US ( per cow), Japan (7,497), the European Union (6,139) and Australia (5,601).

A total of 1,304 million liters of milk was produced by Israeli cows in 2010.

All of Israel's milk consumption originates from dairy farms within the country with most herds consisting largely of Israel-Holsteins, a high-yielding, disease-resistant breed. Furthermore, sheep milk is exported. In terms of poultry, which makes up two thirds of meat consumption, 85% originate from moshavim.

IAPV – Israeli acute paralysis virus – was first discovered here. After recent reports of severe mortality with symptoms similar to acute bee paralysis virus, Maori et al., 2007 isolated IAPV and published an RNA sequence and several other molecular components. IAPV continues to be significant in apiculture here and has since been identified in colonies around the world.

Fishing and aquaculture

The Mediterranean Sea is a source of salt-water fishing; freshwater fishing occurs on Lake Kinneret (the Sea of Galilee). Pioneering technology is being used to breed fish in artificial lakes in the Negev desert. Scientists of the Bengis Center for Desert Aquaculture at Ben-Gurion University of the Negev discovered that the brackish water under the desert can be used for agriculture, aquaculture and a combination of the two. This has led to the farming of fish, shrimp and crustaceans in the Negev.

Commercial fishing in the eastern Mediterranean has declined significantly due to depletion of fish reserves and the supply of fresh fish in Israel depends almost entirely on aquaculture. Fish from the Sea of Galilee include silver carp, grass carp, grey mullet, St. Peter's fish, rock bass, silver perch, and Asian seabass introduced from Australia. Fish grown in cages submerged in the sea include gilthead seabream (called denis in Israel), European sea bass and a South American variety of meager. Trout and salmon are raised in special canal-like ponds of running water of the Dan River, a tributary of the Jordan River.

Fruit and vegetables
Israel is one of the world's leading fresh citrus producers and exporters, including oranges, grapefruit, tangerines and a hybrid of a grapefruit and a pomelo, developed in Israel.

More than forty types of fruit are grown in Israel. In addition to citrus, these include avocados, bananas, apples, olives, cherries, figs, plums, nectarines, grapes, dates, strawberries, prickly pear (tzabbar), persimmon, loquat and pomegranates. Israel is the second leading producer of loquat after Japan. Almond is also grown.

In 1973, two Israeli scientists, Haim Rabinowitch and Nachum Kedar, developed a variety of tomato with slower ripening than ordinary tomatoes in a hot climate. Their research led to the development of the world's first long shelf-life commercial tomato varieties. This discovery transformed agricultural economics in Israel, promoting the export of the vegetables seeds and the move to high-tech farming. It also had a global impact, enabling large-scale production through the prevention of spoilage. Previously, farmers were forced to discard 40 percent of their produce.

The Tomaccio tomato was developed by Hishtil Nurseries, which conducted a 12-year breeding program using wild Peruvian tomato species to create a sweet snack tomato.

Flowers

Israel produces vast quantities of flowers for export. Flower exports in 2000 exceeded $50 million. In addition to flowers favored in the West such as lilies, roses, and tulips, Israel exports desert varieties. It has become a major player in the global floral industry, especially as a supplier of traditional European flowers during the winter months. Similar to floriculture around the world, Israel's flower cultivation relies heavily on introduced species. Here these especially include Ornithogalum dubium, Leucojum aestivum and Paeonia.

Research and technology

Israel is a world leader in agricultural research and development, which has led to dramatic increases in the quantity and quality of the country's crops. The drive to increase yields and crop quality has led to the development of new seed and plant varieties, as well as to innovations such as a soil conditioner substance (vermiculite) which, when mixed with local soils, boosts crop yields, and drip irrigation.

A very accomplished and well regarded agricultural geneticist in the country is Morris Soller. Soller is mostly known for livestock genetics and crop genetics.

The Agritech Exhibition
The Agritech Exhibition, held once every three years, is one of the leading international events of its kind to showcase Israel and international agriculture technologies.  It traditionally attracts many Ministers of Agriculture, decision-makers, experts, practitioners and trainers in agriculture, and thousands of visitors.  It provides an opportunity to see at one site the latest developments in agricultural sector and advanced agro-technologies, especially in the fields of irrigation, water management, arid zone agriculture, intensive greenhouse cultivation, development of new seed varieties, and organic and ecologically-oriented agriculture.

At the Agritech Exhibition in 2012 there were more than 35,000 visitors, and more than 250 exhibitors.

Organic farming
Organic produce makes up 1.5% of Israeli agricultural output, but it accounts for 13% of agricultural exports. Israel has  of organic fields: Vegetable crops grown in open fields account for 65% of the land use, fruit orchards – 25%, hothouse vegetables – 6% and herbs – 4%.

Government regulation
Farm surpluses have been almost eradicated in the country, with farms having production and water quotas for each crop, which have stabilised prices. Production quotas apply to milk, eggs, poultry and potatoes. Israel's government also encourages a reduction in agricultural costs by trying to encourage specialised farming, and halting of production of crops for which no sufficiently profitable markets exist. The Ministry of Agriculture oversees the country's agricultural sector, including maintenance of standards of plant and animal health, agricultural planning, and research and marketing.

Disease
A survey conducted across 20172018 made the first detection of Xylella fastidiosa in the country. This was found on almond in the Hula Valley, which is in the northeast. Polymerase chain reaction (PCR) identified it as the Xylella fastidiosa subsp. fastidiosa (Xff) subspecies.

Maps

See also
Agricultural Union
Agrexco
 Agricultural Research Organization, Volcani Center
Economy of Israel

References

External links

Israel plows new ground in exotic crops
 Agricultural Crop Areas & Agricultural Crop Types by natural region, 2017, Israel Central Bureau of Statistics